The 2006 Seattle Seahawks season was the franchise's 31st season in the National Football League (NFL), fifth season playing at Qwest Field, and eighth under head coach Mike Holmgren. The season began with the team attempting to improve on their 13–3 record from 2005, repeat as National Football Conference (NFC) champions, and return to the Super Bowl. The team, while winning their NFC West division, only advanced as far as the Divisional round of the NFL playoffs, losing to the eventual NFC champion Chicago Bears in overtime.

Offseason

NFL draft

Final roster

Schedule

Preseason

Regular season

Source: 2006 NFL season results

Postseason

Standings

Game summaries

Preseason

Week P1: vs. Dallas Cowboys

Week P2: at Indianapolis Colts

Week P3: at San Diego Chargers

Week P4: vs. Oakland Raiders

Regular season

Week 1: at Detroit Lions

The Seahawks won their regular season opener against the Detroit Lions on September 10. Despite the Seahawks' offense failing to score a single point, Josh Brown had a big day, as he provided all of the Seahawks' points.  He kicked a 20-yarder, a 50-yarder, and a 42-yard field goal as time expired to win the game. Meanwhile, the defense limited the Lions to just two field goals.

With the win, the Seahawks started out the season at 1–0.

Deion Branch trade
On September 11, the Seahawks announced they had acquired wide receiver Deion Branch in a trade with the New England Patriots. In return, they gave their first-round pick in the 2007 NFL Draft to the Patriots.

Week 2: vs. Arizona Cardinals

After a low-scoring victory in Detroit, the Seahawks played their Week 2 home-opener against their fellow NFC West rival, the Arizona Cardinals.  Unlike Game 1, Seattle's offense got off to a strong start, as RB Shaun Alexander got a 2-yard TD run, while QB Matt Hasselbeck completed a 49-yard TD pass to WR Darrell Jackson.  That's how the rest of the first half would end up.  In the third quarter, the score of the period was Arizona kicker Neil Rackers completed a 43-yard field goal.  In the fourth quarter, the Seahawks got a 1-yard TD run by FB Mack Strong.  The Cardinals would get a touchdown, which would come in the form of a 40-yard TD pass from QB Kurt Warner to WR Bryant Johnson, but fortunately, Seattle would maintain the lead for the win.  The Seahawks would extend their home winning streak to 11 straight games and improved to 2–0.

Week 3: vs. New York Giants

The Seahawks held on to defeat the New York Giants 42–30 after leading 42–3 going into the 4th quarter. Prior to the game the Giants had complained to the NFL about the level of crowd noise at Qwest Field and suggested that some of the noise was artificial. Last year the Giants were called for 11 false start penalties in a 24–21 overtime loss at Seattle. The complaint became public and the predictable result was a boisterous Seattle crowd and inspired play from the team.

Deion Branch saw his first action with the Seahawks as he caught two passes for 23 yards and ran once for eight yards.

One day after the game, the Seahawks reported that MVP Running Back Shaun Alexander had a cracked bone in his foot that would sideline him for a few weeks.

With the win the Seahawks improved to 3–0 and increased their home game streak to 12 games.

Week 4: at Chicago Bears

The Seahawks met the 3–0 Chicago Bears in a primetime matchup of NFC powerhouses at Soldier Field. The Seahawks took the lead on an early field goal, but momentum quickly shifted to the hometown Bears. Two Matt Hasselbeck interceptions midway through the 2nd quarter led to 10 Chicago points and a 20–6 halftime lead. Any hopes for a comeback were erased after the Bears scored a touchdown on their first possession of the second half for a 27–6 lead.

The Seahawks running attack was diminished without the injured Shaun Alexander. Near constant pressure on Hasselbeck, including 5 sacks, thwarted the effectiveness of the 4 receiver offense that had confused the Giants the week before.

The team flight back to Seattle was diverted to South Dakota for a "medical emergency", which turned out to be Defensive Consultant Ray Rhodes feeling ill after the game. He was checked out at a Rapid City, South Dakota hospital and released.

With the loss, the Seahawks went into their bye week at 3–1.

Week 6: at St. Louis Rams

Still recovering from the loss to the Bears and without Shaun Alexander and WR Bobby Engram, the Hawks were ineffective for much of the first half. Trailing 21–7, Mike Holmgren blistered the paint in the locker room and a different Hawks team took the field in the second half. Seattle scored 20 unanswered points to lead 27–21 and looked to have put the game away after a Lofa Tatupu interception late in the game. However, RB Maurice Morris fumbled on the Ram 7-yard line with 2:48 left. A few plays later Ram QB Marc Bulger hit Torry Holt with a 67-yard TD pass to give the Rams a 28–27 lead with 1:38 remaining.

Matt Hasselbeck engineered a final drive from the Seahawks' 17-yard line and led the team to the Rams' 31-yard line. A premature celebration erupted on the Rams' sideline as the Seahawks were called for an illegal formation after Hasselbeck spiked the ball to stop the clock with four seconds left in the game. The Rams believed the Seahawks had committed a false start which would have resulted in a ten-second runoff on the clock that would have ended the game. Instead, the Seahawks were penalized five yards, pushing them back to the 36-yard line. Despite the setback, Josh Brown still kicked a 54-yard field goal to win the game, 30–28.

Brown's kick was tied for the second longest game-winning field goal in NFL history, behind Tom Dempsey's 63-yard effort in 1970. (It would be supplanted a week later by Tampa Bay kicker Matt Bryant's 62-yard field goal in a win over the Philadelphia Eagles.) Brown also became the first player in NFL history to make 3 field goals of 49 yards or longer in the same quarter. In the third quarter, Brown achieved the equally rare feat of hitting both uprights on an unsuccessful 34-yard field goal attempt.

With the win, the Seahawks improved to 4–1.

Week 7: vs. Minnesota Vikings

The return of Steve Hutchinson had the 12th man at Qwest Field in a frenzy. A knee injury to Matt Hasselbeck early in the second half silenced them. An early 72-yard touchdown reception by Darrell Jackson staked the Seahawks to a 7–3 lead, but the Vikings scored a TD of their own in the second quarter and the teams went to the half tied at 10. On the Hawks first possession of the 3rd quarter, Vikings LB E.J. Henderson rolled onto Hasselbeck's right leg and sent the QB to the turf well after he had released the ball. Hasselbeck left the field with the assistance of trainers, and did not return. Seneca Wallace took over at QB, completing  14 of 25 passes with two interceptions and a fumble in his own endzone. The Hawks gave up a 15-yard TD pass from RB Mewelde Moore to TE Jermaine Wiggins to trail 17–10 as Hasselbeck was walking to the locker room. They looked to have weathered the storm and recaptured momentum when punter Ryan Plackemeier pinned the Vikings on their own 5-yard line. The next play resulted in the Vikings' longest ever TD play, a 95-yard romp by Chester Taylor that brought back memories of Bo and the Boz. Suddenly the deficit was 14 points. The Hawks drove for an FG to cut the lead to 11, but a failure to convert a 4th and 1 play on the next drive ended any hope of pulling out the game. The loss ended the Seahawks' 12-game winning streak at home.

An MRI scan on Hasselbeck's knee revealed a second degree sprain and he missed 4 games.

With the loss, the Seahawks fell to 4–2 and their 12-game winning streak at home was snapped.

Week 8: at Kansas City Chiefs

The Seahawks ventured to Arrowhead Stadium without stars Matt Hasselbeck and Shaun Alexander. Seneca Wallace made his first career start in a stadium where the Seahawks have won only twice in their last 20 visits. The story of the game was not the Seahawks wounded offence, but rather the failure of the supposedly healthy defence.

The Chiefs controlled the ball for over 42 minutes of the contest, piled up 499 total net yards, and were able to sustain drives all afternoon. The Seahawks defence was only able to force one Chiefs punt, early in the fourth quarter. Despite being dominated in time of possession and yardage, the Seahawks found themselves leading the game 28–27 after a Kelly Herndon 61-yard TD return of a fumbled field goal attempt and a 49-yard TD grab by Darrell Jackson with just over 6 minutes remaining. The Chiefs responded as they had all game, with an 8-play, 80-yard drive capped off by Larry Johnson's 4th TD of the game. A successful 2-point conversion made the score 35–28. A last drive by the Seahawks ended when Seneca Wallace completed a short sideline pass to FB Mack Strong for 8 yards on 4th down and 15 from the Chiefs 46-yard line.

Fox became the sixth network to air a game between these two teams. All Sunday afternoon meetings between 1977–97 were aired on NBC, then from 1998–2001 on CBS (which also aired the 2002 game in Seattle). ESPN broadcast Sunday night games in 1992 and 1998, TNT aired a Thursday night game in 1996, and ABC aired a Monday night game in 2000.

With the loss, the Seahawks fell to 4–3.

Week 9: vs. Oakland Raiders

Hoping to rebound from their road loss to the Chiefs, the Seahawks returned home for a Monday night match-up with the Oakland Raiders.  The Raiders won the coin toss. It would be the last time fortune smiled on them on a windy and wet night at Qwest Field. In the first quarter, QB Seneca Wallace completed a 22-yard TD pass to WR Deion Branch. Later in the first quarter, kicker Josh Brown nailed a 20-yard field goal.  In the second quarter, Brown would get a 25-yard field goal for the only score of the quarter.  After a scoreless third quarter, Brown would put the game away with another 20-yard field goal in the fourth quarter.

While the offense did their job, Seattle's defense had a huge night, sacking Raiders QB Andrew Walter nine times, including three consecutive times on the same set of downs.

With their 16–0 victory over the Raiders, and a 42–0 appearance at the Eagles in 2005, dubbed the Monday Night Massacre by NFL Films, the Seahawks became the first team to post consecutive shutouts on Monday Night Football.  Poetically, the Raiders became the first team to lose in back-to-back MNF shutouts, having lost 27–0 to the San Diego Chargers earlier in 2006.

With the win, the Seahawks improved to 5–3.

Week 10: vs. St. Louis Rams

On a windy, rainy Sunday the Seahawks hosted the Rams looking to take an effective 3 game lead in the division with a win. The Seahawks drove the ball easily on their first possession, moving to the Ram 1-yard line. After a false start penalty, Seneca Wallace was sacked and fumbled, and the Rams returned the ball 89 yards for a touchdown. The Seahawks drove down the field again, this time maintaining possession to the endzone as Darrell Jackson caught a 3-yard TD pass. The lead would change hands 6 more times in the game. With the Rams holding a 16–14 lead in the fourth quarter, Rams coach Scott Linehan chose to challenge a call, nullifying a field goal. The challenge was upheld, but the Rams still faced a fourth down play. Instead of kicking another field goal to increase the lead, Linehan chose to go for a first down. The raucous Qwest Field rose to the occasion, and Rams FB Paul Smith could not hear the play call. Rather than run a pass route he stayed in the backfield to block, and Ram QB Marc Bulger's pass to double covered TE Klopfenstein fell incomplete.

Nate Burleson returned a punt 90 yards for a touchdown and a 21–16 lead. After a Rams TD with 2:37 remaining, a series of penalties against St. Louis changed momentum. A holding penalty nullified a successful 2 point convert. The second attempt failed. A 15-yard personal foul was assessed on the subsequent kickoff, and Josh Scobey returned the ball to the Ram 49-yard line. With a short field and time on the clock, Seneca Wallace and Maurice Morris drove the Seahawks to the Ram 20-yard line, where Josh Brown kicked a game-winning field goal with 9 seconds remaining.

Brown kicked game-winning field goals in both games against the Rams that year.

With their 4th straight win over the Rams, the Seahawks improved to 6–3.

Week 11: at San Francisco 49ers

The Seahawks travelled to Monster Park to face division rival San Francisco. Buoyed by the return of Shaun Alexander to the starting line-up, and having Matt Hasselbeck dressed as the 3rd quarterback, the Seahawks expected to take a stranglehold on the NFC West. Instead, they played a flat first half and fell behind by 20 points – 13 of those coming after 3 turnovers. The Seahawks also allowed the 49ers to gain 163 rushing yards in the first half, whereas Alexander had only 9 yards on 7 carries. He would finish with 37 yards on 17 carries.

A different Hawks team appeared in the second half, scoring quickly on a 38-yard touchdown reception by Deion Branch. The Seahawks added another long touchdown reception by Darrell Jackson with 6:40 remaining in the game, but could not get any closer. A key sequence in the last 2 minutes of the game saw Alexander stopped for a loss on 4th and 1. Following the change of possession, 49ers RB Frank Gore fumbled, recovered by Grant Wistrom. Given a second life, the Seahawks allowed a 9-yard loss on a sack before Seneca Wallace threw an interception. Instead of owning a 3-game lead in the division, the Seahawks only lead the surprising 49ers by a game. The teams meet again December 14 at Qwest Field.

With the loss, the Seahawks fell to 6–4.

Week 12: vs. Green Bay Packers

Snow fell on a Seahawks home game for the first time ever. In a setting that looked more like Green Bay's home field, the Seahawks started poorly on Monday Night Football. Matt Hasselbeck returned after missing 4 games and promptly turned the ball over four times in the first half. Shaun Alexander picked up the slack for the rusty Hasselbeck, rushing a team record 40 times for 201 yards on the evening.  It was a return to MVP form for Alexander, who is still running on a cracked foot injured in the first week of the season.

Josh Brown kicked four field goals in the first half to keep Seattle in the game, and they trailed only 14–12 at the half. All of Green Bay's points came off turnovers, the last 7 when a Hasselbeck fumble was returned for a TD. The snow stopped falling at halftime.

Green Bay drove for a TD on their first possession of the second half to go up 21–12. After both teams had drives stall and were forced to punt, Hasselbeck led the Seahawks on a nine-play, 62-yard drive capped by a 23-yard pass to D. J. Hackett. Seattle drove again late in the third quarter, led by Alexander. On the second play of the 4th quarter, Hasselbeck found Darrell Jackson for a 4-yard TD toss. A 2-point convert gave the Seahawks a 27–21 lead. After a Green Bay field goal cut the Seahawks lead to 3 points, Hasselbeck threw his third TD to Jerramy Stevens to cap an 11-play, 51-yard drive. The Seahawks defense crushed the final three Green Bay drives with two interceptions and a fumble recovery to finish with 4 takeaways on the night.

With the win, the Seahawks improved to 7–4.

Week 13: at Denver Broncos

The Seahawks travelled to Denver to face their old foe from the AFC West. On a frigid Sunday Night game, these Seahawks were able to accomplish what few of their predecessors managed – to come out of Denver with a win. Carrying on their recent troubling tendency of weak first half performances, the Seahawks fell behind 13–7 to the Broncos, who were led by first-time starter Jay Cutler. The Seahawks managed only 2 first downs and 67 yards of total offense in the first half, but remained in the game thanks to Darryl Tapp's 25-yard return of an intercepted Cutler pass for a TD.

In the second half, the teams traded punts and one turnover apiece until Seattle got the ball on its own 39-yard line with 9:42 left in the game. Two long pass completions from Matt Hasselbeck to Darrell Jackson put the Seahawks on the Broncos one-yard line. Shaun Alexander quickly took the ball into the endzone for a 14–13 Seahawks lead. The Broncos fumbled the ensuing kickoff, and Joe Tafoya recovered. Assisted by a holding penalty on third down, the Seahawks moved the ball into range for Josh Brown to kick a 44-yard field goal. The Broncos held onto the following kickoff, but on their first play Cutler threw an interception to Jordan Babineaux for Seattle's  9th takeaway in the past two games. The Seahawks again had to settle for a Brown 23-yard field goal for a 20–13 lead with 3:01 remaining, keeping Denver in the game. The failure to score a TD proved costly, as Cutler connected with WR Brandon Marshall on a 71-yard pass and run play for a game tying TD, assisted by some poor tackling by Seattle.

The Seahawks started the last drive at their own 14-yard line with 2:31 remaining. A key third down reception by Nate Burleson kept the drive alive, and Hasselbeck led the team down to the Broncos 32-yard line with 10 seconds remaining. Josh Brown came on to kick a game-winning, 50-yard FG, his fourth such kick of the season to tie an NFL record.

With the win the Seahawks' lead in the NFC West increased to three games over the 49ers and Rams as they improved to 8–4.

Week 14: at Arizona Cardinals

Coming off their Sunday night victory over the Broncos, the Seahawks flew to the University of Phoenix Stadium for an NFC West rematch with the Arizona Cardinals. In the first quarter, Seattle trailed early as Cardinals QB Matt Leinart completed a 56-yard TD pass to WR Bryant Johnson, while RB Edgerrin James got a 7-yard TD run.  The Seahawks would respond with QB Matt Hasselbeck completing a 23-yard TD pass to WR D. J. Hackett.  In the second quarter, Arizona increased its lead with kicker Neil Rackers nailing a 32-yard field goal. Seattle would draw closer with Hasselbeck completing a 5-yard TD pass to WR Nate Burleson. In the third quarter, the Seahawks took the lead with Hasselbeck's 2-yard TD pass to WR Darrell Jackson for the only score of the period. However, in the fourth quarter, the Cardinals got the win with Leinart's 5-yard TD pass to WR Larry Fitzgerald and Rackers' 40-yard field goal. With the loss, Seattle fell to 8–5.

Week 15: vs. San Francisco 49ers

Despite the loss to the Cardinals, the Seahawks could still clinch the NFC West at home in a Thursday night game against the San Francisco 49ers with the Seahawks hoping to avenge the earlier loss to the 49ers. On a rainy, windy night, Seattle started off strong with RB Shaun Alexander getting a three-yard TD run for the only score of the first quarter. The 49ers offense was almost nonexistent in the first half, as seven of San Francisco's first eight drives ended in three-and-outs. However, the Seahawks still allowed a 39-yard field goal by Niners kicker Joe Nedney near the end of the half.

After a scoreless third quarter, Seattle's defense started giving way.  49ers QB Alex Smith completed an 8-yard TD pass to TE Vernon Davis. An unsportsmanlike conduct penalty on Davis combined with an excellent kickoff return by Nate Burleson gave Seattle prime field position at the San Francisco 33-yard line. However, the Seahawks failed to convert on a fourth down play on the first series from scrimmage, and turned the ball over on downs. Smith would take advantage by driving his team downfield and completing a 20-yard TD pass to RB Frank Gore. San Francisco delivered the final blow with Smith running for an 18-yard TD on a naked bootleg with no defenders near him. The Seahawks got a 22-yard touchdown from QB Matt Hasselbeck to TE Jerramy Stevens with under two minutes left, but it wouldn't be enough as Seattle would get swept by the 49ers. With the loss, the Seahawks fell to 8–6.

Week 16: vs. San Diego Chargers

Trying to end a two-game skid, the Seahawks went home for a Week 16 fight with the San Diego Chargers.  After a scoreless first quarter, the Chargers struck in the second quarter with QB Philip Rivers completing a 9-yard TD pass to WR Vincent Jackson for the only score of the period.  In the third quarter, San Diego increased its lead with kicker Nate Kaeding nailing a 46-yard field goal.  Fortunately, Seattle started to strike back with RB Shaun Alexander getting a 33-yard TD run.  However, the Chargers answered back with Kaeding kicking a 40-yard field goal.  In the fourth quarter, the Seahawks finally took the lead with Alexander getting a 9-yard TD run, along with kicker Josh Brown's 33-yard field goal.  However, the Chargers wrapped up the game with Rivers and Jackson hooking up again on a 37-yard TD pass.  With the loss, Seattle fell to 8–7.

Week 17: at Tampa Bay Buccaneers

Trying the end a three-game skid, the Seahawks flew to Raymond James Stadium for their last game of the regular season against the Tampa Bay Buccaneers.  In the first quarter, Seattle drew first blood with kicker Josh Brown nailing a 35-yard field goal, while RB Shaun Alexander got a 1-yard TD run.  In the second quarter, the Buccaneers would get their only score of the game as QB Tim Rattay completed a 4-yard TD pass to WR Joey Galloway.  Afterwards, Seattle took over for the rest of the game as QB Matt Hasselbeck completed a 5-yard TD pass to WR D. J. Hackett.  In the second half, Brown wrapped up the game with a 30-yard field goal in the third goal, along with a 23-yard field goal in the fourth quarter.  With the win, the Seahawks wrapped up the regular season at 9–7 and acquired the NFC's #4 seed.

However, CB'S Kelly Jennings, and Jimmy Williams were injured during the match.  They would join Kelly Herndon and Marcus Trufant on the injured list.

Postseason
Seattle entered the postseason as the #4 seed in the NFC.

NFC Wild Card Playoff: vs. #5 Dallas Cowboys

Entering the NFC playoffs as the fourth-seed, the Seahawks began their playoff run at home against the fifth-seeded Dallas Cowboys.  In the first quarter, Seattle struck first blood with a 23-yard field goal, while Cowboys kicker Martín Gramática nailed a 50-yard field goal.  In the second quarter, Seattle went back into the lead with Brown kicking a 30-yard field goal.  However, Dallas took the lead with QB Tony Romo completing a 13-yard TD pass to WR Patrick Crayton before halftime.  In the third quarter, the Seahawks regained the lead with QB Matt Hasselbeck completing a 15-yard TD pass to TE Jerramy Stevens.  However, following the touchdown drive, the Cowboys marched right back into the lead as WR Miles Austin returned a kickoff 93 yards for a touchdown.  In the fourth quarter, Dallas increased its lead with Gramática kicking a 29-yard field goal.  Later, Seattle retook the lead with a safety off a Terry Glenn fumble from a hit by rookie CB Kelly Jennings, along with Hasselbeck hooking up with Stevens again on a 37-yard TD pass (followed up with a failed a two-point conversion).  Afterwards, the Cowboys got into position to score late in the game, but Romo botched the hold of a field-goal attempt.  He then ran to try for the first down or the touchdown, but was tackled by strong safety Jordan Babineaux.  The Seahawks then ran out as much of the clock as they could.  With two seconds left, Dallas had one final shot as Romo threw up a Hail Mary pass, but Seattle batted the ball down for the win.

With the victory, the Seahawks improved their overall record to 10–7 and advanced to the Divisional Round to take on the Chicago Bears.  They also became the first team to win a playoff game after losing the Super Bowl since the 1997 Patriots.

In the words of the Seattle Times, the Seahawks won "a wild wild-card game."

NFC Divisional Playoff: at #1 Chicago Bears

Coming off the win over the Cowboys, the Seahawks traveled to Soldier Field to face the top-seeded Chicago Bears in the Divisional round. In the first quarter, Seattle trailed early with Bears RB Thomas Jones getting a 9-yard TD run for the only score of the period.  In the second quarter, the Seahawks got on the board with QB Matt Hasselbeck completing a 16-yard TD pass to WR Nate Burleson.  However, immediately following Seattle's score, Chicago responded with QB Rex Grossman completing a 68-yard TD pass to WR Bernard Berrian.  The Seahawks struck back with RB Shaun Alexander getting a 4-yard TD run, yet Jones helped the Bears out with a 7-yard TD run.  In the third quarter, Seattle took the lead with kicker Josh Brown kicking a 40-yard field goal, while Alexander got a 13-yard TD run.  However, in the fourth quarter, Chicago tied the game with kicker Robbie Gould getting a 41-yard field goal.  In overtime, the Seahawks won the coin toss and received the ball first. Hasselbeck led the team to around midfield, but on their last third down of the game, he threw the ball out of bounds. On fourth down the Seahawks punted to the Bears who were able to get the ball close enough for Gould to kick a 49-yard field goal.

With the loss, Seattle ended its season with an overall record of 10–8.

References

Seattle
NFC West championship seasons
Seattle Seahawks seasons
Seattle Seahawks